Catch the Heat, also known as Feel the Heat, Sin escape and Narcotraficantes, is a 1987 Argentine-American action film directed by Joel Silberg and written by Stirling Silliphant. It stars Tiana Alexandra, David Dukes, Rod Steiger and Brian Thompson. It was also released with the alternative titles Sentir la persecución ("Feel the Chase") and Misión: Alto riesgo ("Mission: High Risk").

Synopsis 
A police officer who is very skilled with martial arts (and has a technique of her own) disguises herself as a showgirl/dancer to infiltrate a South American drug ring, while at the same time she unwittingly strikes up a relationship with an undercover special agent who carries the same goal.

Cast 
 Tiana Alexandra ... Checkers Goldberg
 David Dukes ... Waldo Tarr
 Rod Steiger ... Jason Hannibal
 Brian Thompson ... Danny Boy
  ... Raul De Villa
 John Hancock ... Ike
 Brian Libby ... Brody
 Toru Tanaka ... Dozu
 Jessica Schultz ... Maria
 Russell Clark ... Reggie
  ... Jose Calsado
 Cecilia Maresca ... Juanita
  ... Dr. Bleyer
 Miguel Habud ... Ramón
 John Dresden ... San Francisco Agent
 Bill Wood ... Officer #1
 Amparo Ibarlucia ... Hannibal's Secretary
 Masafumi Sakanashi ... Kendo Teacher
 Gerardo Bardelli ... Pianist
 Gary Jensen ... Drug Hustler at San Francisco
 Gene Lehfeldt ... Drug Hustler at San Francisco
 Michael Carr ... Drug Hustler at San Francisco
 Norberto Maceri ... Dancer
 Ariel Tejada ... Dancer
 Patricio Vargas ... Dancer
 Hugo Velardez ... Dancer
 Roberto Vernes ... Dancer
 Roberto Blanzaco ... Dancer

Production 
It was filmed in Technicolor and shot over a year in three locations: Los Angeles, San Francisco and the Villa María ranch, which was created by renowned Argentine painter and architect Alejandro Bustillo, and located in Máximo Paz (Buenos Aires Province).

Release 
The film first premiered in 1986 in Argentina, and then premiered on USA in October 1987. It was later shown on cable TV in 1993, under the title Sentir la persecución ("Feel the Chase").

Bibliography 
 A dictionary of Argentine Films (1930-1995) - Manrupe, Raúl; Portela, María Alejandra (2001). "Un diccionario de films argentinos (1930-1995)". Buenos Aires: Editorial Corregidor (Corregidor Publishing House). pp. 536–537. ISBN 950-05-0896-6.
 Hollywood in Don Torcuato. The Adventures of Roger Corman and Hector Olivera - Fevrier, Andrés (2020, Argentina). "Hollywood en Don Torcuato. Las aventuras de Roger Corman y Héctor Olivera". This work is licensed under the Creative Commons Attribution-NonCommercial-ShareAlike license. 4.0 International (CC BY-NC-SA 4.0). https://creativecommons.org/licenses/by-nc-sa/4.0/deed.es.

References

External links 
 
 Catch the Heat at Cinenacional.com

1987 films
1987 action films
1987 drama films
1980s action drama films
American action adventure films
Argentine action films
American action drama films
Films set in Buenos Aires
Films set in Los Angeles
Films shot in San Francisco
Films shot in Los Angeles
Films shot in Buenos Aires
Films with screenplays by Stirling Silliphant
American crime drama films
Films about the illegal drug trade
Films about organized crime in the United States
Films directed by Joel Silberg
1980s American films